Olga Safronova (née Bludova; born 5 November 1991) is a Kazakhstani sprinter. She competed in the 100 m event at the 2012 Summer Olympics and advanced to the semifinals. At the 2016 Summer Olympics she was eliminated in the heats of the 100 m, 200 m and 4×100 m events. At the 2010 Asian Indoor Athletics Championships, she won a bronze medal in the 60 m and a silver at the 4×400 m relay. Safronova won four medals at the Asian Games in 2014–2018, two individual and two in the 4×100 m relay.

Her mother Irina was a hurdler, her brother Maxim is a high jumper. Her husband Konstantin Safronov competed internationally in the long jump.

Competition record

1Disqualified in the final
2Did not finish in the final

References 

Living people
1991 births
Kazakhstani female sprinters
Sportspeople from Karaganda
Olympic athletes of Kazakhstan
Athletes (track and field) at the 2012 Summer Olympics
Athletes (track and field) at the 2016 Summer Olympics
Kazakhstani people of Russian descent
Asian Games gold medalists for Kazakhstan
Asian Games silver medalists for Kazakhstan
Asian Games bronze medalists for Kazakhstan
Asian Games medalists in athletics (track and field)
Athletes (track and field) at the 2010 Asian Games
Athletes (track and field) at the 2014 Asian Games
Athletes (track and field) at the 2018 Asian Games
World Athletics Championships athletes for Kazakhstan
Medalists at the 2014 Asian Games
Medalists at the 2018 Asian Games
Asian Athletics Championships winners
Competitors at the 2011 Summer Universiade
Competitors at the 2013 Summer Universiade
Competitors at the 2017 Summer Universiade
Athletes (track and field) at the 2020 Summer Olympics
Olympic female sprinters
20th-century Kazakhstani women
21st-century Kazakhstani women